Bethell Robinson (1861 – 26 October 1933) was an English footballer who played in the Football League for Bolton Wanderers. He also played for Preston North End (the season they reached the FA Cup Final; It is unknown if Harrison played in the Cup run), West Bromwich Albion, Newton Heath, Hyde, Darwen and Bootle.

1888-1889
Bethell Robinson made his Football League debut on 8 September 1888, as a full-back, at Pike's Lane, the then home of Bolton Wanderers. The opposition were Derby County and Bolton Wanderers lost the match 6–3. When Robinson played at full–back on 20 October 1888 against Aston Villa he was approximately 27 years 158 days old; which made him, on the seventh weekend of League football, Bolton Wanderers' oldest player. Robinson played in 16 of the 22 League games played by Bolton Wanderers in season 1888–89. Robinson, as a full-back, played in Bolton Wanderers defence that achieved one League clean-sheet and kept the opposition to one-League-goal-in-a-match on four separate occasions. Even though a Bolton Wanderers player Bethel Robinson appeared for West Bromwich Albion in the 1888–89 FA Cup. Robinson played full-back including in the semi-final at Bramall Lane, against "The Invincibles" Preston North End. West Bromwich Albion lost the semi-final 1–0.

References

1862 births
1933 deaths
People from the Borough of Chorley
English footballers
Association football fullbacks
Preston North End F.C. players
Bolton Wanderers F.C. players
West Bromwich Albion F.C. players
Manchester United F.C. players
Hyde United F.C. players
Darwen F.C. players
Bootle F.C. (1879) players
English Football League players